DGT may refer to:

 Deansgate railway station, Manchester, England (National Rail station code)
 DGT board, a chessboard
 Diffusive gradients in thin films technique, for detecting chemicals in wet environments
 Directorate-General for Translation, of the European Commission
 Directorate General of Traffic, Spain
 Discounted gift trust, in the UK
 Ndra'ngith language (ISO 639-3: dgt), an Australian language